Pyropelta corymba is a species of small sea snail, a deep-water limpet, a marine gastropod mollusk in the family Pyropeltidae

Distribution
This species occurs in the Gulf of California, Western Mexico.

Habitat 
This small limpet occurs at hydrothermal vents and seeps

References

 Warén, A. & Bouchet, P. (2001) Gastropoda and Monoplacophora from hydrothermal vents and seeps; new taxa and records. The Veliger, 44, 116–231
 McLean J.H. (1992) Cocculiniform limpets (Cocculinidae and Pyropeltidae) living on whale bone in the deep sea off California. Journal of Molluscan Studies 58: 401-414.

Pyropeltidae
Gastropods described in 1987